The Bishop of Liverpool is the Ordinary of the Church of England Diocese of Liverpool in the Province of York.

The diocese stretches from Southport in the north, to Widnes in the south, and from the River Mersey to Wigan in the east. Its see is in the City of Liverpool at the Cathedral Church of Christ. The Bishop's residence is Bishop's Lodge, Woolton — east of Liverpool city centre.

The office has existed since the founding of the diocese in 1880 under Queen Victoria. John Perumbalath has been the Bishop of Liverpool since the confirmation on 20 January 2023 of his election.

List of bishops

Assistant bishops
Among those who have served as Assistant Bishop of Liverpool were:
1968–1987 (ret.): William (Bill) Baker, lecturer at St Katharine's College until 1975 and former Anglican Bishop of Zanzibar

Those who have served in retirement as honorary assistant bishops include:
19461958 (d.): Herbert Gresford Jones, Canon Residentiary (until 1956) and retired Bishop of Warrington

References

External links
 Crockford's Clerical Directory - Listings

Liverpool
 
Bishops of Liverpool